"" (What my God wants should always happen) is a Lutheran hymn in German. The text from c. 1550 is attributed to Albert, Duke of Prussia. The melody, Zahn No. 7568, goes back to a tune by Claudin de Sermisy, written in 1529 for a secular French song. The hymn has belonged to core Lutheran hymnody without interruption and is part of the Protestant hymnal Evangelisches Gesangbuch as EG 364.

It has been set to music throughout centuries, including by Johann Sebastian Bach, who based a chorale cantata on it, Was mein Gott will, das g'scheh allzeit, BWV 111, and used the first stanza as a chorale in the St Matthew Passion and several cantatas.

History 
The text is attributed to Albert, Duke of Prussia, and is said to have been written in 1547 in three stanzas, with an additional stanza added in a broadsheet publication in Nürnberg c. 1554, and in Fünff Schöne Geistliche Lieder in Dresden in 1556. The melody was composed by Claudin de Sermisy, published in 1529 for a secular French song.

The hymn has belonged to core Lutheran hymnody without interruption, appearing in several hymnals. It is part of the German-language Protestant hymnal Evangelisches Gesangbuch as EG 364.

Content and text 

"" is an expression of unlimited trust in God, even when facing death. It is in four stanzas of 10 lines each. The text as used in modern hymnals is:

Melody and musical settings 
The hymn has always been sung to a tune that originated with Claudin de Sermisy, which was published in 1529 to a secular text, "Il me suffit de tous mes maulx". It appeared with a paraphrase of Psalm 129 in 1540 in the Antwerp Souterliedekens (Psalm songs). The melody appeared with "Was mein Gott will" in 's hymnal Christliche und tröstliche Tischgesenge, mit Vier Stimmen (Christian and consoling table songs, for four voices) in Erfurt in 1571.

The artful original melody, with many syncopes and irregular metre, was simplified early to notes of even length. The tune is also used for Paul Gerhardt's "Ich hab in Gottes Herz und Sinn". Johann Sebastian Bach used this version in his chorale cantata Was mein Gott will, das g'scheh allzeit, BWV 111. He also used individual stanzas in other cantatas, and the first stanza in his St Matthew Passion as movement 31, as the reply of Jesus after his prayer in Gethsemane. In translations of the scene, it was rendered as "O Father, let Thy will be done". A singable translation in the 2004 edition by Carus-Verlag has "God's will is best, it shall be done".

The following example is from Bach's St Matthew Passion:

Literature 
 Philipp Wackernagel: 1240. Was mein Gott will, das gescheh allzeit und 1241. Was mein Gott will, das geschehe allzeit. In: Das deutsche Kirchenlied von der ältesten Zeit bis zu Anfang des XVII. Jahrhunderts, 3. Band, Leipzig 1870, pp. 1070–1071

Notes

References

External links 

 7 J. S. Bach chorale settings of Was mein Gott will, das gscheh allzeit, Zahn 7568 by Luke Dahn (retrieved 21 June 2017)
 , performed at the Brixen Cathedral by the Tölzer Knabenchor and the Hofkapelle München

1550s works
16th-century hymns in German
Lutheran hymns